Tjahaja Timoer (Indonesian: Light of the East, EYD: Cahaya Timur) was a Malay-language Peranakan newspaper printed in Malang, Dutch East Indies, from 1907 to 1942.

History
In its early years it was a supporter of Theosophy, then popular among elites in the Indies.

Despite its Chinese ownership, by the 1910s the paper was noted to be very sympathetic to the Indische Party. Before long it was also expressing sympathy for the Sarekat Islam, an anti-colonial mass organisation. This was due to the influence of its editor, Raden Djojosoediro, who supported both movements.

In 1922 the owners of  entered into a business deal with the Soerabaijasch Handelsblad to allow their printing presses to be used to print a new Dutch language newspaper in Malang, with journalist Brunsveldt van Hulten as its new editor. This was apparently done in a move against Jahn's Advertentieblad, a newspaper which had a monopoly in the city. It alleged that this former editor, Andanjomo, in collaboration with Sarekat Islam leader Mohamed Joenoes, was terrorizing the populace of Malang and forcing native servants into a clandestine organization called  (Indonesian: Resistance Union). It is unclear whether this allegation was factual because this organization was not mentioned subsequently.

 continued to publish in Malang until the Japanese occupation of the Dutch East Indies in 1942.

External links
 WorldCat holdings for Tjahaja Timoer
 Digitized issues of Tjahaja Timoer (1914-42) in the Center for Research Libraries collection

References

Defunct newspapers published in Indonesia
Malay-language newspapers
Dutch East Indies
Malang
1907 establishments in the Dutch East Indies
Newspapers published in the Dutch East Indies
1942 disestablishments in the Dutch East Indies